Joseph Heller (1923–1999) was an American satirical novelist.

Joseph, Josef or Yosef Heller may also refer to:

Joseph Heller (historian) (born 1937), Israeli historian
Joseph Heller (zoologist) (born 1941), Israeli zoologist
Josef Heller, Czechoslovakian luger 
Yosef Heller, American Jewish Orthodox rabbi